The men's individual road race at the 1988 Summer Olympics in Seoul, South Korea, was held on September 27, 1988. There were 136 participants from 54 nations in the race over 196.80 km, with 27 cyclists who did not finish. The maximum number of cyclists per nation was three, down from four in previous editions of the event. The event was won by Olaf Ludwig of East Germany, the first medal for the nation in the men's individual road race (and first victory for any German cyclist). West Germany also earned its first medals in the event, with Bernd Gröne's silver and Christian Henn's bronze.

Background

This was the 13th appearance of the event, previously held in 1896 and then at every Summer Olympics since 1936. It replaced the individual time trial event that had been held from 1912 to 1932 (and which would be reintroduced alongside the road race in 1996).

Algeria, Andorra, the People's Republic of China, Chinese Taipei, the Republic of the Congo, Monaco, Sierra Leone, Suriname, and the United Arab Emirates each made their debut in the men's individual road race. Great Britain made its 13th appearance in the event, the only nation to have competed in each appearance to date.

Competition format and course

The mass-start race was on a 196.8 kilometre course over the Tongil-ro Circuit in Paju. The course was "very flat and easy."

Schedule

All times are Korea Standard Time adjusted for daylight savings (UTC+10)

Results

The easy course kept the cyclists together and limited non-finishers; nearly 100 cyclists moved in a large pack through most of the race. Ludwig made two break attempts late, being caught by renowned sprinter Abdoujaparov and aborting the charge the first time. For the second breakaway, he was joined by Gröne; this time, Ludwig continued his attack and outsprinted Gröne at the end to win.

See also
 Women's Individual Road Race

References

 Official Report

Road cycling at the 1988 Summer Olympics
Cycling at the Summer Olympics – Men's road race
Men's events at the 1988 Summer Olympics